The Lawton Constitution is a daily newspaper published in Lawton, Oklahoma.  It began publishing in 1904.  John Shepler bought the paper in 1910. It remained with successive generations of Shepler's family until his great-grandsons, Don and Steve Bentley, sold the paper on March 1, 2012, to brothers Bill and Brad Burgess, who are lawyers and businessmen in Lawton. The brothers sold the paper to Southern Newspapers, Inc. in April 2018.

References

External links
 The Lawton Constitution

Publications established in 1904
Newspapers published in Oklahoma